Phạm Mạnh Hùng (born 3 March 1993) is a Vietnamese footballer who plays as a centre-back for V.League 1 club Hải Phòng and the Vietnam national football team.

International career

International goals

U-23

Honours

International

Vietnam U23
 Third place : Southeast Asian Games: 2015

References 

1993 births
Living people
Vietnamese footballers
Association football central defenders
V.League 1 players
Song Lam Nghe An FC players
People from Nghệ An province
Vietnam international footballers
Southeast Asian Games bronze medalists for Vietnam
Southeast Asian Games medalists in football
Competitors at the 2015 Southeast Asian Games